Gábor Máté (born 9 February 1979) is a Hungarian discus thrower. He currently resides in Mobile, Alabama, United States.

His personal best throw is 66.54 metres, achieved in April 2000 in Walnut.

Competition record

References

1979 births
Living people
Hungarian male discus throwers
Athletes (track and field) at the 2000 Summer Olympics
Athletes (track and field) at the 2004 Summer Olympics
Athletes (track and field) at the 2008 Summer Olympics
Olympic athletes of Hungary
Universiade medalists in athletics (track and field)
Universiade bronze medalists for Hungary
Competitors at the 1999 Summer Universiade
Medalists at the 2005 Summer Universiade